Zenodorus may refer to
Zenodorus (spider), a genus of spiders
Zenodorus son of Lysanias, King and ruler of Iturea
Zenodorus (mathematician), ancient Greek mathematician
, builder of the Colossus of Nero in Rome